Zupfgeigenhansel was a German folk duo, one of the most successful groups to emerge on the German folk scene in the 1970s. It consisted of Erich Schmeckenbecher and Thomas Friz. The group was named after the collection of folk songs of the same name, which was published in 1909. 

The group started playing in folk-clubs, mainly in southern Germany, in 1974. They then started appearing on the radio programme Liederladen of the Südwestfunk broadcasting station. They released their first album, Volkslieder I for the pläne record company in 1976, and later in the year their second album, Volkslieder II. In 1978 they received the award of "Artists of the Year" in one of the categories of the  German Phonoakademie. They disbanded in 1985.

Discography 
1976 – Volkslieder I
1977 – Volkslieder II
1978 – Volkslieder III
1979 – ’ch hob gehert sogn (Yiddish songs)
1980 – Eintritt frei (Live)
1982 – Miteinander
1983 – Kein schöner Land including "Kein schöner Land"
1984 – Liebeslieder
1985 – Andre, die das Land so sehr nicht liebten

See also
 Zupfgeigenhansel: Wenn alle Brünnlein fließen. JUMBO Neue Medien und Verlag GmbH, Hamburg 2003,  (in German)

References

External links 
 Homepage of Erich Schmeckenbecher

German folk music groups
Musical groups established in 1974
Musical groups disestablished in 1985
German musical duos